Tasfiyeh Shekar (also Romanized as Tasfīyeh Shekar and Tasfīyeh-Ye-Shekar) is a village in Anaqcheh Rural District, in the Central District of Ahvaz County, Khuzestan Province, Iran. At the 2006 census, its population was 413, in 83 families.

References 

Populated places in Ahvaz County